The Armenian Red Cross Society was established in 1920 and it has its headquarters in Yerevan.

It supports people affected by the Nagorno-Karabakh conflict.

External links
Official website
IFRC profile

Red Cross and Red Crescent national societies
Organizations established in 1920
1920 establishments in Armenia
Yerevan
Medical associations based in Armenia